The Acheron River is a river in the South Island of New Zealand, in Marlborough and flows into the Waiau Toa / Clarence River. The Alma and Severn Rivers flow into the Acheron before it joins the Waiau Toa / Clarence.

See also
Acheron River (Canterbury)
Acheron (river in Greece)

Références 

Rivers of the Marlborough Region
Rivers of New Zealand